The Sequence of Saint Eulalia, also known as the Canticle of Saint Eulalia is the earliest surviving piece of French hagiography and one of the earliest extant texts in the vernacular langues d'oïl (Old French). It dates from around 880.

Eulalia of Mérida was an early Christian martyr from Mérida, Spain, who was killed during the Persecution of Diocletian around 304.  Her legend is recounted in the 29 verses of the Sequence, in which she resists pagan threats, bribery and torture from the pagan emperor Maximian. She miraculously survives being burned at the stake, but is finally decapitated. She then ascends to heaven in the form of a dove.

The Sequence was composed in verse around 880, soon after the rediscovery of the relics of a saint of the same name, Eulalia of Barcelona, in 878.

Manuscript
The manuscript containing the Sequence is a collection of sermons by Gregory of Nazianzus. It is first mentioned in a 12th-century catalog of the library of Saint-Amand Abbey, although the production of the manuscript has been dated to the early 9th century. It is not known with certainty where it was produced. B. Bischoff suggests that it came from a scriptorium in (Lower) Lotharingia, but not from Saint-Amand itself, given its style of construction and the handwriting, which cannot be matched to other manuscripts produced there during the same period.

The manuscript is less significant for its original content, however, than for the empty pages at the end that later scribes filled in with additional texts. These include:
the top half of f141: a 14-line Latin poem about Saint Eulalia
the top half of f141v: the Sequence of Saint Eulalia in vernacular Romance
Again, it cannot be established with certainty where these additions were made, whether at Saint-Amand or elsewhere.

It remained lost throughout the 18th century, until the entire contents of the abbey library were confiscated and transferred to Valenciennes in 1792, by order of the revolutionary government. According to his account, it only took him one afternoon to find the manuscript and to realize that it contained another important text, the Sequence of Saint Eulalia.

Text
The Eulalia text is a sequence or "prose" consisting of 14 assonant couplets, each written on one line and separated by a punctus, followed by a final unpaired coda verse. The Sequence follows no strict meter. Most of the couplets consist of two ten-syllable verses, although some have 11, 12, or 13 syllables.

A transcription of the original text is provided below (with abbreviations expanded and some word boundaries inserted), along with a reconstructed phonetic transcription and an English translation.

Analysis

Dialect

The language of the Sequence presents characteristics of Walloon, Champenois, and Picard. At the time, these three Oïl varieties shared a common , or written literary koiné. The evidence points to a geographic origin for the text in modern-day Wallonia or an adjacent region of north-east France.

Some northern/northeastern dialectal features of the texts are:
the stressed form  of the feminine singular dative pronoun (line 13)
Fr. )

The pronoun  that appears in line 19 (instead of the expected feminine form ) has been variously explained as a dialectal feature, a pejorative neuter ("they threw it into the fire"), or simply a scribal error.

Line 15
Line 15 of the Sequence is "one of the most vexed lines of Old French literature". The identity of the verb is debated: early editors read , but a reexamination of the manuscript by Learned (1941) revealed that the copyist originally wrote . Scholars disagree about whether the line turning the ⟨r⟩ into an ⟨n⟩ was an inadvertent ink smudge or a deliberate correction by the copyist. Several interpretations have been proposed for both readings, including:
 : "reunites, assembles", "affirms"
 : "hardens", "adores", "endures"
Scholars further disagree about whether the possessive adjective in  refers to Eulalia or to Maximian, and about the nature of this . Questions also surround the syntactic construction of the line, as well as the interpretation of the verse within the context of the Sequence.

The following examples illustrate the variety of translations suggested for this verse:
 ""
 ""
 "She steeled her soul (she strengthened herself inwardly)"
 "That she worship his false god"
 ""

See also
Oaths of Strasbourg

Notes

References

Further reading
Jeanette M. A. Beer (1989). "Eulalie, La Séquence de Ste.". Dictionary of the Middle Ages. Vol. 4.

External links

  Cantilène de sainte Eulalie from the Bibliothèque municipale de Valenciennes
 Old French Online (B. Bauer and J. Slocum), Lesson 4: La Cantilène de Sainte Eulalie
  Bibliographie de la Cantilène de Sainte Eulalie (Yves Chartier)

Medieval poetry
Medieval French literature
Christian hagiography
Walloon culture
History of Wallonia
9th-century poems
Works set in the 4th century
Diocletianic Persecution